Elachyophtalma is a genus of moths of the family Bombycidae. The genus was erected by Cajetan Felder in 1861.

Species
Elachyophtalma bicolor (Bethune-Baker, 1904)
Elachyophtalma cotanoides Rothschild, 1920
Elachyophtalma dohertyi Rothschild, 1920
Elachyophtalma doreyana Rothschild, 1920
Elachyophtalma fergussonis Rothschild, 1920
Elachyophtalma flava van Eecke, 1924
Elachyophtalma flavolivacea Rothschild, 1916
Elachyophtalma goliathina Rothschild, 1920
Elachyophtalma infraluteola Rothschild, 1920
Elachyophtalma insularum Rothschild, 1920
Elachyophtalma inturbida (Walker, 1865)
Elachyophtalma kebeae (Bethune-Baker, 1904)
Elachyophtalma keiensis Rothschild, 1920
Elachyophtalma meeki Rothschild, 1920
Elachyophtalma melanoleuca Rothschild, 1920
Elachyophtalma mimiocotana Rothschild, 1920
Elachyophtalma picaria Walker, 1865
Elachyophtalma quadrimaculata van Eecke, 1924
Elachyophtalma semicostalis Rothschild, 1920
Elachyophtalma tricolor C. Felder, 1861

References

Bombycidae